Franklin Zielecke (born 12 June 1946) is a German weightlifter. He competed in the men's middleweight event at the 1972 Summer Olympics.

References

External links
 

1946 births
Living people
German male weightlifters
Olympic weightlifters of East Germany
Weightlifters at the 1972 Summer Olympics
Sportspeople from Berlin